Wadi Quda'ah is a valley and hamlet located about 10 kilometers east of Ras Al Khaimah, United Arab Emirates. The valley flows into the Wadi Bih.

Hedgehogs and caracals live in the valley, and dates have been grown at the higher elevations.

There are several rock climbing trails in the valley.

References

Populated places in the Emirate of Ras Al Khaimah